Bryan Cranston is an American actor, director, producer and screenwriter, who has appeared in films, television series, video games and stage plays.

Film

Television

Stage

Video games

Music videos

Commercials

References

External links
 
 Bryan Cranston's Best Movies on AMC

Director filmographies
Male actor filmographies
American filmographies